Maldharis are  herdsmen community in Gujarat, India. Originally nomads, they came to be known as Maldharis after settling in Junagadh district (mainly Gir Forest).

"Maldhari" is an occupational term which refers to people from a variety of castes and communities. The literal meaning of Maldhari is keeper (dhari) of the animal stock (mal). They are notable as the traditional dairymen of the region, and once supplied milk and cheese to the palaces of rajas.

Etymology 

The word "Maldhari" can be loosely translated into English as "herdsman". derives from the Gujarati language words maal (animal stock) and dhari (owner/keeper). Hence, the one who owns animals, breeds them and/or herds them is called Maldhari.

Culture
Maldharis are descendants of nomads who periodically came from Pakistan, Rajasthan and other parts of Gujarat, and finally settled in the Banni grasslands.

These semi-nomadic herders spend eight months of the year criss-crossing sparse pasturelands with their livestock including sheep, goats, cows, buffalo, and camels in a continual quest for fodder. During the monsoon season, the Maldhari generally return to their home villages as more new grass grows closer to home during the rains. For villages in some areas, weddings are traditionally held just one day each year, on Krishna Janmashtami (Lord Krishna’s birthday), which falls in the midst of the monsoon.

Some girls in some regions are kept from going to school and expected to spend the early years of their life stitching elaborate garments for their wedding day, or, if they have been married off as children, as many are, for the ceremony performed when each moves in with her husband, normally when she is in her early twenties.

Communities

In different regions, the Maldharis belong to different castes. The Gir Forest National Park is home to around 8,400 Maldharis as of 2007. The majority of the Maldharis in Gir belong to Charan, Bharwad and Rabari castes. Minority castes include Koli, Kathi, Bawa, Meghwal and Makranis. The Maldharis of Gir, Alech and Barda have included among the Scheduled Tribes since 1956, although these castes are not classified as Scheduled Tribes outside the forest areas.

Lifestyle
The pastoral Maldhari community live a simple life. They live in small mud houses deep in the forests, with no electricity, running water, schools or access to healthcare.

They earn a living by producing milk from their cattle. They have developed a local breed of buffalo that is well known in India for its high productivity and strong resilience to the harsh conditions of the Banni. The Banni Buffalo was recognized as the 11th breed of buffalo in the country in 2010, the first one to be registered post independence. The breed registration process was carried out through the Maldharis themselves.

They grow vegetables and collect wild honey. Their main sources of cash income are sale of high quality ghee, milk, wool, animals and handicrafts. They trade their produce in the local market for essential items like food grains. Most are unable to count or use money and are illiterate.

Jewelry
Their jewelry and clothing portray the Maldharis' sense of identity and tradition. It symbolizes their beliefs and ideals. Men wear gold hoops and buttons in their ears. On their milking hands, many wear silver rings embossed with the Siva lingam. The milk that dribbles over the ring is an offering to the god, replacing the need to make oblations at a temple.

Maldhari women's ears are folded and stretched with a large amount of hanging silver.  Their wrists are sheathed in heavy, hourglass-shaped bracelets, carved from elephant tusks. However, many wear plastic replicas for everyday use. They keep the more precious ivory originals stored in cans filled with vegetable oil. The oil keeps them from cracking and makes them easier to slip on. Such ornamentation disguises the poverty in which they live. It is worn as a status symbol to impart an impression of wealth upon which their family honor depends.

References

External links
 27 Photographs Maldhari people

Indigenous peoples of South Asia
Social groups of India
Modern nomads